Fritz Peter (1899–1949) was a German mathematician who helped prove the Peter–Weyl theorem. He was a student of Hermann Weyl, and later became headmaster of a secondary school .

Publications

 .

References

20th-century German mathematicians
1949 deaths
1899 births